Gutmans is a surname. Notable people with the surname include:

 Andi Gutmans, Swiss-born Israeli programmer and entrepreneur
 Ernests Gutmans (1901–?), Latvian boxer

See also
 Gutman
 Gutmann (surname)